Rossana Rory (born 7 September 1927) is an Italian retired actress best known for her performance as Norma in Mario Monicelli's caper film Big Deal on Madonna Street (1958).

Career
Rory began working as a model at the age of seventeen, posing mainly for the stylist Vincenzo Ferdinandi and in fotoromanzi in the weekly magazines Sogno, Luna Park, and Cine Illustrato. In 1951, she made her film debut in Max Neufeld's Licenza premio. Dissatisfied by a series of supporting roles, Rory went to London to attend acting courses at the Royal Academy of Dramatic Art, with hopes of a career in Hollywood.

Her lack of luck in American films convinced her to return to Italy, where she appeared in Guido Malatesta's El Alamein (1957) and Mario Monicelli's Big Deal on Madonna Street (1958). The last film she made before her retirement from cinema was Michelangelo Antonioni's L'eclisse (1962).

Partial filmography
 The Ungrateful Heart (1951)
 It Takes Two to Sin in Love (1954)
 The River Changes (1956)
 The Big Boodle (1957)
 Hell Canyon Outlaws (1957)
 Captain Falcon (1958)
 Big Deal on Madonna Street (1958)
 Robin Hood and the Pirates (1960)
 Come September (1961)

References

External links
 

1927 births
Living people
20th-century Italian actresses
People from Rome